State Route 778 (SR 778, OH 778) is a short north–south state highway in northern Ohio. The route was created in 1942 and has not changed since.

Route description
Existing entirely within Seneca County's Adams Township, SR 778 has an AADT of 1150. The route's short journey begins at the intersection of SR 101 and County Road 43 (CR 43), and travels north, taking over for the county road. The two-lane connector route travels primarily amidst farmland, passing a small group of trees and a couple of homes on the west side of the roadway prior to arriving at its endpoint at the intersection of SR 19 and CR 44. As SR 778 enters the intersection from the south, SR 19 forms the northern and eastern legs, and CR 44 uses the western approach to the intersection.

History
First appearing in 1942, SR 778 was designated along the short alignment that it currently occupies between SR 101 and SR 19. The route has not seen any significant change since its inception. The road was repaved in 1983 and 1995.

Major intersections

References

778
Transportation in Seneca County, Ohio
State highways in the United States shorter than one mile